Catur Pamungkas (born July 19, 1989) is an Indonesian professional footballer who plays as a midfielder.

Club career

Martapura
He was signed for Martapura to play in Liga 2 in the 2020 season.

References

External links
 Catur Pamungkas at Liga Indonesia
 Catur Pamungkas at Soccerway

1989 births
Association football midfielders
Living people
Indonesian footballers
Indonesian Premier Division players
Persekam Metro players
Liga 1 (Indonesia) players
Arema F.C. players
Liga 2 (Indonesia) players
People from Malang
Sportspeople from East Java